Research Papers in Economics (RePEc) is a collaborative effort of hundreds of volunteers in many countries to enhance the dissemination of research in economics. The heart of the project is a decentralized database of working papers, preprints, journal articles, and software components. The project started in 1997. Its precursor NetEc dates back to 1993.

Overview 
Sponsored by the Research Division of the Federal Reserve Bank of St. Louis and using its IDEAS database, RePEc provides links to over 1,200,000 full-text articles. Most contributions are freely downloadable, but copyright remains with the author or copyright holder. It is among the largest internet repositories of academic material in the world.

Materials to RePEc can be added through a department or institutional archive or, if no institutional archive is available, through the Munich Personal RePEc Archive. Institutions are welcome to join and contribute their materials by establishing and maintaining their own RePEc archive.

Leading publishers, such as Elsevier and Springer, have their economics material listed in RePEc. RePEc collaborates with the American Economic Association's EconLit database to provide content from leading universities' working paper or preprint series to EconLit. Over 1500 journals and over 3300 working paper series have registered, for a total of over 1.2 million articles, the majority of which are online.

The information in the database is used to rank the more than 50,000 registered economists. Andrei Shleifer is currently the highest-ranked economist, followed by Joseph Stiglitz and James Heckman. The economics department of Harvard University is ranked first, followed by the World Bank and the University of Chicago. Massachusetts is the top region, followed by the United Kingdom and California. There are also rankings by country and sub-discipline.

RePEc also indexes worldwide economics institutions through its Economic Departments, Institutes and Research Centers in the World (EDIRC) database.

RePEc promotes open-access journals and also benefits from open access for its own citation analysis efforts.

Since 2018, RePEc has used NamSor gender classifier to estimate female representation in Economics. As of February 2021, 15894 of 61488 economists are female, or a proportion of 25.8%.

See also 
 List of academic databases and search engines
 Social Science Research Network

References

Further reading

External links 

 

Eprint archives
Open-access archives
Projects established in 1997
Economics websites
Bibliographic databases and indexes
Economics research
Federal Reserve Bank of St. Louis data services
Citation indices